John Halstead Surface Jr. (August 12, 1913 – September 2, 2001) was an American tennis player.

A native of Kansas City, Missouri, Surface picked up the sport of tennis aged 15. He was self taught and trained at the Rockhill Tennis Club in Kansas City. In his senior year at Central High School he won the state interscholastic singles championship. He played collegiate tennis for the University of Texas.

Surface had a top national ranking of seven in 1937 and was a member of the United States Davis Cup squad that year, without featuring in a tie. He twice reached the singles fourth round at the U.S national championships, including in 1940 when he had a win over Gardnar Mulloy en route. Internationally, Surface's title wins included the All-India Championships and he had a fourth round appearance at Roland Garros.

References

External links
 

1913 births
2001 deaths
American male tennis players
Texas Longhorns men's tennis players
Sportspeople from Kansas City, Missouri
Tennis people from Missouri